Jonah Koslen is an American singer-songwriter and musician best known for his work with the Michael Stanley Band and Breathless in the 1970s and 1980s.

Biography
After graduating from Beachwood High School, Koslen joined the Cleveland, Ohio-based band, Snake Eyes, with former Eli Radish Band bassist Danny Sheridan. In 1974, he joined with Michael Stanley, Daniel Pecchio, formerly of Glass Harp, and Tommy Dobeck to form The Michael Stanley Band. During his tenure with the band, they released three albums for Epic Records and became popular in Northeast Ohio. Sharing songwriting duties with Stanley, Koslen contributed two of the group's classic songs: "Strike Up the Band" and "Nothing's Gonna Change My Mind".

Koslen left the Michael Stanley Band in 1977 and formed the band Breathless the following year. Breathless consisted of Koslen, bassist Bob Benjamin, drummer Kevin Valentine, percussionist Rodney Psyka, guitarist Alan Greene and keyboardist Mark Avsec, formerly with Wild Cherry. Signed to EMI America Records, the group released their debut album Breathless, produced by Don Gehman, in July 1979. Following the album's release, Breathless toured as an opening act, including a dozen shows opening for Kiss.  The single, "Takin' It Back", scratched the Billboard Hot 100 at No. 92, but the album did not chart. With support from Cleveland radio station WMMS, Breathless became a popular act locally, headlining Blossom Music Center in June 1980. The band released its second album, Nobody Leaves This Song Alive in October 1980. Again, the album received airplay in Northeast Ohio but failed to catch on nationally. Breathless disbanded in 1981, with Avsec and Valentine joining Donnie Iris' band "The Cruisers".

Koslen formed another band, Jonah Koslen and the Heroes, that released the album Aces, in 1983, and also the albums Orange and Agora Live, but they soon broke up. After that Koslen moved to California and worked on various music projects. He briefly reunited with Michael Stanley in 1993 for the album The Ghost Poets.

Discography

Albums
 Michael Stanley Band
1975: You Break It...You Bought It!
1976: Ladies' Choice
1977: Stagepass
1992: Right Back at Ya (1971–1983)
1997: Misery Loves Company: More of the Best 1975–1983

 Solo
1978: Back Tracks
2008: Telling on Myself

 Breathless
1979: Breathless
1980: Nobody Leaves This Song Alive
1993: Picture This...The Best of Breathless

 Jonah Koslen and the Heroes
1983: Aces
1984: Orange
 Agora Live

 The Ghost Poets
1993: The Ghost Poets

References

Other sources
Adams, Deanna. Rock 'n' Roll and the Cleveland Connection (2002): pp. 261–268, pp. 416–418

1952 births
Living people
Musicians from Cleveland
American male singer-songwriters
Singer-songwriters from Ohio